William Miagh (sometimes Meagh) was a bishop in Ireland during the sixteenth century.

Previously Dean of Kildare he was nominated to the see of Kildare
on 17 May 1644 by Henry VIII in opposition to the Pope's appointment. He died on 15 December 1548.

References

1548 deaths
Deans of Kildare
Anglican bishops of Kildare
Year of birth unknown